The 2022–23 UMBC Retrievers men's basketball team represented the University of Maryland, Baltimore County in the 2022–23 NCAA Division I men's basketball season. The Retrievers, led by second-year head coach Jim Ferry, played their home games at the Chesapeake Employers Insurance Arena in Catonsville, Maryland as members of the America East Conference.

Previous season
The Retrievers finished the 2021–22 season 18–14, 11–7 in America East Play to finish in second place. They defeated UMass Lowell and Hartford to advance to the championship game of the America East tournament where they lost to Vermont. They received an invitation to The Basketball Classic where they withdrew due to UMBC having health concerns.

Roster

Schedule and results

|-
!colspan=12 style=| Regular season

|-
!colspan=12 style=| America East tournament
|-

Source

References

UMBC Retrievers men's basketball seasons
UMBC Retrievers
UMBC Retrievers men's basketball
UMBC Retrievers men's basketball